This is a list of City God Temples in China.

Hong Kong
Shing Wong Temples in Hong Kong are dedicated to Shing Wong, a god who protects a city. They include:

References

Folk religious temples in China